The Irish League in season 1998–99 comprised two divisions, one of 10 teams and one of 8, and Glentoran won the championship.

Premier Division

League standings

Results

Matches 1–18

Matches 19–36

First Division

League standings

References
Northern Ireland - List of final tables (RSSSF)

NIFL Premiership seasons
1
Northern